The 2015–16 Danish Cup was the 62nd season of the Danish Cup competition. The winners of the competition qualified for the second qualifying round of the 2016–17 UEFA Europa League.

First round
94 teams were drawn into this round. Matches were played on 4, 11, 12 and 19 August 2015.

Second round
56 teams were drawn into this round. Matches were played on 25 August, 1, 2, 8, 9 and 23 September 2015.

Third round 
32 teams were drawn into this round. Matches were played on 22, 23, 24 and 29 September 2015.

Fourth round 
16 teams were drawn into this round. Matches were played on 21, 27, 28 and 29 October 2015.

Quarter-finals 
8 teams were drawn into this round. Matches were played on 1, 2 and 16 March and 5 April 2016.

Semi-finals

First leg

Second leg

Final 
The final took place at Telia Parken in Copenhagen, which is usually the stadium of Copenhagen. It was played on the day of Feast of the Ascension (5 May).

References

External links
 

Danish Cup seasons
Denmark
Cup